Leucobrephos is a genus of moths in the family Geometridae.

Species
 Leucobrephos brephoides (Walker, 1857)
 Leucobrephos middendorfii (Menetries, 1858)
 Leucobrephos mongolicum Vojnits, 1977

References

Archiearinae
Geometridae genera